Tour Sequana (previously known as Tour Mozart) is an office skyscraper in Issy-les-Moulineaux, Val de Seine business district, close to Paris.

100 meters high, it can accommodate 2,720 people. It was designed by Arquitectonica in collaboration with the design office Arup Sustainable Design, and inaugurated on September 14, 2010.

The tower, built by Bouygues, is HQE certified by counting five HQE targets reached with the “high performance” level, and six HQE targets achieved with the “average performance” level.

All the equipment should enable the tower to save 50% compared to the energy consumption of traditional offices, or  emissions of 12 kg / m2 per year.

In 2007, Bouygues Immobilier won the Grand Prix Eco Building Performance in the “Very High Building” category, rewarding the energy and environmental quality of its tower.

See also 
 List of tallest buildings and structures in the Paris region
 List of tallest buildings in France

References

External links 
 Tour Sequana

Sequana
Hauts-de-Seine
Accor
Office buildings completed in 2010
Arquitectonica buildings
21st-century architecture in France